Uvalde High School is a public high school for grades 9–12 in Uvalde, Texas, in the United States. It has a current enrollment of about 1,250 students. The school is part of the Uvalde Consolidated Independent School District.

History
The first school in Uvalde was built in 1885. It initially served all grade levels. The school was expanded in 1891, but later burned down in 1898. A new school was built in its place in 1900. The current structure was built in 1908 following an increase in enrollment.

In 1949, the Batesville Independent School District began sending its students to Uvalde High School.

In 1970, a large group of Hispanic students boycotted their classes after the all-white school board declined to renew a Hispanic elementary school teacher's contract. The students also protested the lack of bilingual education. By the end of the year, the school board had not given in to their demands.

Notable alumni
 Dolph Briscoe, governor of Texas
 Johnny Hatley, football player
 Brooks Raley, baseball player
 Salvador Ramos, perpetrator of the Robb Elementary School shooting

See also

 List of high schools in Texas

References

External links
 

Public high schools in Texas
Schools in Uvalde County, Texas